A statue of Christopher Columbus by the sculptor Giovanni Polizzi formerly stood in Columbus Park, in Buffalo, New York.

History
The statue was originally installed at Columbus Park in 1952. The park's statue of Columbus has been vandalized multiple times since 2015. In 2017 a petition drive was started asking the city to rename the park and remove the statue.

Removal

On July 10, 2020, the statue of Columbus was removed. The same day, city officials also stated that Columbus Park would be renamed.

See also
 List of monuments and memorials removed during the George Floyd protests
 List of monuments and memorials to Christopher Columbus

References

Buildings and structures in Buffalo, New York
Monuments and memorials in New York (state)
Monuments and memorials to Christopher Columbus
Outdoor sculptures in New York (state)
Sculptures of men in New York (state)
Statues in New York (state)
Buffalo, New York
Vandalized works of art in New York (state)
Statues removed in 2020